This is a list of trolleybus systems in the United States by State. It includes all trolleybus systems, past and present.  About 65 trolleybus systems have existed in the U.S. at one time or another. In this list, boldface type in the "location" column and blue background colored row indicates one of the five U.S. trolleybus systems still in operation.

Alabama

Arkansas

California

Colorado

Connecticut

Delaware

Georgia

Hawaii

Illinois

Indiana

Iowa

Kansas

Kentucky

Louisiana

Maryland

Massachusetts

Michigan

Minnesota

Missouri

Nevada

New Jersey

New York

North Carolina

Ohio

Oregon

Pennsylvania

Rhode Island

South Carolina

Tennessee

Texas

Utah

Virginia

Washington

Dual-mode (diesel-trolley) buses operated 15 September 1990 – 24 January 2005 on routes using the Downtown Seattle Transit Tunnel. The overhead wire system in the tunnel was not connected to that used by surface trolleybus services.

Wisconsin

Notes

See also

 List of trolleybus systems, for all other countries
 Trolleybus
 Trolleybus usage by country
 List of streetcar systems in the United States
 List of tram and light rail transit systems
 List of metro systems

Sources

References

Books and periodicals

 
 
 
 
 
 Trolleybus Magazine (ISSN 0266-7452). National Trolleybus Association (UK). Bimonthly.

Further reading
 McKane, John, and Anthony Perles.  1982. "Inside Muni".  Glendale (CA), US: Interurban Press.
 Perles, Anthony. 1981.  "The People's Railway" (San Francisco).  Glendale (CA): Interurban Press.
 Saitta, Joseph P. "Traction Yearbook '81", '82, '83, '84, '85, '86, '87.  Merrick (NY): Traction Slides International.
 Schultz, Russell E. 1980.  "A Milwaukee Transport Era: The Trackless Trolley Years".  Glendale: Interurban Press.
 Sebree, Mac, and Paul Ward. 1973. Transit's Stepchild, The Trolley Coach (Interurbans Special 58). Los Angeles: Interurbans. LCCN 73-84356.
 Wonson, Richard L. 1983. "Trackless Trolleys of Rhode Island, The". Cambridge (MA): Boston Street Railway Assn., Inc. (Bulletin 18).

External links

 All-Time List of North American Trolleybus Systems

United States